Žalgiris Kaunas may refer to:

FBK Kaunas, Lithuanian football club from Kaunas, formerly known as Žalgiris Kaunas
BC Žalgiris, basketball club from Kaunas
MRK Žalgiris Kaunas, women's handball club from Kaunas
FK Kauno Žalgiris, football club from Kaunas